The following is a list of Japanese-language television channels.

Japan

Other countries

References

Japanese language television channels
 Television channels